Stonewall Resources is an Australian gold mining company with exploration and development operations in New South Wales, Australia and Mpumalanga Province, South Africa.

History
The company was founded in 2008 as Meridien Resources Limited. Early on the main focus of the company was the development of the Lucky Draw gold tailings dam in Burraga, New South Wales. The company was listed on the Australian Securities Exchange in 2011 under the symbol MRJ. (The similarly named Meridian Minerals Limited was also listed on the ASX under the symbol MII.) In 2012, the company expanded by acquiring Stonewall Resources, a South Africa focused miner, and renamed the company after the target.

The company entered into a share sale agreement with a Chinese buyer in November 2013. Shandong Qixing Iron Tower Co., Ltd, a subsidiary of the Qixing Group listed on the Shenzhen Stock Exchange, entered into the Sale Share Agreement with Stonewall for a purchase price of US$141 million for 100% shares of Stonewall Mining, the subsidiary of the company holding the South African assets. However, the deal was terminated by SQIT before completion. SQIT would later be acquired in 2014 by the Longyue Group and was renamed the Northcom Group.

Projects
In Mpumalanga Province, the company is developing the Transvaal Gold Mining Estates (TGME) project, which consists of open pit and underground mines in an area near the historic gold mining towns of Pilgrims Rest and Sabie. Within the TGME project is the refurbishment of the Rietfontein underground gold mine. The company is also refurbishing a processing plant in the area. Within the TGME project, exploration work was ongoing in 2018 for a gold discovery at Theta Hill with the use of two diamond rigs and a reverse circulation rig.

References

Companies listed on the Australian Securities Exchange
Mining companies of Australia
Australian companies established in 2008
Companies based in Sydney